Eutomis is a genus of moths in the subfamily Arctiinae. It contains the single species Eutomis minceus, which is found in South Africa.

References

Natural History Museum Lepidoptera generic names catalog

Endemic moths of South Africa
Arctiinae